Larijani may refer to any of five brothers all in Iranian politics, four of whom are listed below:

 Ali Larijani, is a doctor and the former Speaker of the Majlis of Iran
 Mohammad Javad Larijani, a mathematician and former deputy Foreign Minister 
 Sadegh Larijani, is the former head of the judicial system of Iran
 Bagher Larijani, is an Iranian Medical Practitioner (Professor of Endocrinology) and the Director General of the Endocrinology and Metabolism Research Institute of Tehran University of Medical Sciences
 Fazel Larijani, is a physicist and diplomat.